Joseph Clay (July 24, 1769August 27, 1811) was a member of the United States House of Representatives from Pennsylvania.

Joseph Clay was born in Philadelphia in the Province of Pennsylvania. He was elected as a Democratic-Republican to the Eighth, Ninth, and Tenth Congresses, and served until his resignation after March 28, 1808.  He was also engaged in banking.  Clay served as chairman of the United States House Committee on Ways and Means during the Ninth Congress.  He was one of the managers appointed by the House of Representatives in 1804 to conduct the impeachment proceedings against John Pickering, judge of the United States District Court for the District of New Hampshire.

Joseph Clay was elected as a member of the American Philosophical Society held at Philadelphia in 1799.

He became cashier of the Farmers & Mechanics’ Bank of Philadelphia, and died in Philadelphia in 1811.  Interment in Christ Church Burying Ground.

He was the father of diplomat John Randolph Clay, and the grandfather of brevet brigadier general Cecil Clay.

References

Sources

The Political Graveyard

1769 births
1811 deaths
Politicians from Philadelphia
Burials at Christ Church, Philadelphia
People of colonial Pennsylvania
Democratic-Republican Party members of the United States House of Representatives from Pennsylvania